Ildar Valeyev (born November 29, 1991) is a Russian professional ice hockey defenceman. He is currently playing with Torpedo Nizhny Novgorod of the Kontinental Hockey League (KHL). 

On January 15, 2015, Valeyev made his Kontinental Hockey League debut playing with Torpedo Nizhny Novgorod during the 2014–15 KHL season.

References

External links

1991 births
Living people
Russian ice hockey defencemen
Torpedo Nizhny Novgorod players